Nupserha schmidi is a species of beetle in the family Cerambycidae. It was described by Stephan von Breuning in 1966.

Subspecies
 Nupserha schmidi tambaensis Holzschuh, 1990
 Nupserha schmidi darjeelingensis Holzschuh, 1990
 Nupserha schmidi schmidi Breuning, 1966
 Nupserha schmidi arunensis Holzschuh, 1990

References

schmidi
Beetles described in 1966